Bluenog is an enterprise software company.  The company's flagship product is Bluenog ICE, an enterprise 2.0 application development platform built on pre-integrated open-source content management, collaboration, enterprise portal and business intelligence projects.  Headquartered in Piscataway Township, N.J., Bluenog is also a Red Hat, Oracle and Actuate partner.

History
Bluenog was formed in 2006 to address the growing needs of companies looking to leverage Web 2.0 functionality using both open source and commercial software. 
The company secured $4 million in venture capital from NewSpring Capital in 2008 in order to expand the company's products and services offering.  Bluenog received an additional $1 million through New Jersey's Edison Innovation Fund in April 2009

Products
Following the venture capital funding, Bluenog released ICE 4.0.  The latest version of the product, ICE 4.5, was released in June 2009 at the Enterprise 2.0 conference in Boston, which added among other features increased collaboration functionality, including a secure enterprise wiki maker.

Awards
In 2009, Bluenog won two technology awards: InformationWeek Startup 50 and RedHerring 100.

References

Information technology companies of the United States